A witch hat is a style of hat worn by witches in popular culture depictions, characterized by a conical crown and a wide brim.

Origins and design

The origins of the witch hat as displayed today are disputed.

Potentially, this style of hat then became associated with black magic, Satan-worship and other acts of which the Jews were accused.

Another theory posits that the witch hat has origins in the phrygian cap which is associated with Mithraism, a Greek and then Roman mystery cult.

An earlier theory is the mummified remains of the "witches" of Subeshi, who wore very tall, pointed black hats that resembled the iconic headgear of their sisters in medieval Europe. Subeshi, dated to between the 4th and 2nd centuries BCE, is located in a high gorge just to the east of the important city of Turfan.

A similar theory posits that the image of the archetypal witch hat was born from anti-Quaker prejudice. Although the hats traditionally worn by Quakers themselves were not pointed, Quaker caps were a focus of cultural controversy, and it is conceivable that the Puritan backlash against Quakers in the mid-18th century contributed to hats becoming part of the iconography of the demonic.

Yet another hypothesis proposes that witch hats originated as alewife hats, distinctive headgear worn by women who home-brewed beer for sale. According to this suggestion, these hats gained negative connotations when the brewing industry, dominated by men, accused alewives of selling diluted or tainted beer. In combination with the general suspicion that women with knowledge of herbology were working in an occult domain, the alewife hat could have become associated with witchcraft.

L. Frank Baum's 1900 novel The Wonderful Wizard of Oz featured illustrations that portrayed the Wicked Witch of the West sporting a tall, conical hat. This fashion accessory was carried over for the 1939 film adaptation, in which the Wicked Witch was played by character actress Margaret Hamilton.

In media
Witch hats have been worn by a number of fictional characters, including:

 Granny Weatherwax, from the Discworld series by Terry Pratchett
 The titular witch in Le Fée Carabosse, directed by Georges Méliès, 1906
 The Wicked Witch of the West, from The Wonderful Wizard of Oz, 1900
 Gandalf, from The Hobbit and The Lord of the Rings, 1937
 Jennifer (Veronica Lake), from I Married a Witch, 1942
 Samantha Stephens, from Bewitched, 1964
 Orko, from He-Man and the Masters of the Universe, 1983
 Minerva McGonagall, from Harry Potter (the story includes a character that is itself such a hat), 1997. The novels also describe "pointed hats" as part of the student uniform for a school of witchcraft and wizardry, though these rarely appear in the film adaptations.

Depending upon the material in which the hat is made, the crown may regularly be observed in a flexed, bent or crumpled condition.

See also 
 List of headgear
 Pointed hat

References

External links

Hats
Fiction about magic
Magic items
European witchcraft
Galician symbols
Halloween